Richard L. Lucero, a New Mexico businessman, was the longest-serving mayor of Española, New Mexico, serving on and off for a total of 22 years. 

Lucero is the owner of Country Farm Supply, a store on Española's Riverside Drive, that his family have owned since the 1970s. In 2004, he founded Española Military Academy, based on a similar school in Oakland, California, with the vision of improving academic achievement through the use military discipline. In 2008, the Academy underwent a funding crisis as State officials sought to withdraw funding based on students' performance and radical teaching methods.

The Richard L. Lucero Center, Española's Public Library and Recreational Swim and Athletic Center, was named in his honor during his administration.

References

New Mexico Republicans
Living people
1934 births
People from Española, New Mexico